TDF 2 or TDF-2 was a French communications satellite which was to have been operated by Télévision de France (France Télécom). It was intended to be used to provide television broadcast services to Europe, however it failed before entering service. It was constructed by Aérospatiale, based on the Spacebus 300 satellite bus, and carried five Ku-band transponders.

Launch 
TDF 2 was launched by Arianespace using an Ariane 44L H10 launch vehicle flying from ELA-2 at Centre Spatial Guyanais, Kourou, French Guiana. The launch took place at 22:25:00 UTC on 24 July 1990. It was a Spacebus 300 satellite bus.

Mission 
TDF 2 was placed into a geostationary orbit at a longitude of 19.2° West. In August 1997, at 36° East, the bird joined the Eutelsat fleet.  TDF 2 is expected to remain in service at least until early 1999.

See also 

 1990 in spaceflight

References 

Communications satellites of France